State Route 254 (SR 254) is a  southwest-northeast state highway located in the northeastern part of the U.S. state of Georgia. It travels through portions of Hall and White counties.

Route description
SR 254 begins at an intersection with SR 284 (Main Street to the south, Shoal Creek Road to the north) in Clermont, in the northeastern part of Hall County. The route hads northeast through the northeastern part of Clermont along a northern section of Main Street. It makes a slight northwest jog before resuming its northeasterly routing. Just after resuming its trek to the northeast, it intersects US 129/SR 11 (Cleveland Highway). This intersection is just prior to entering the south-central part of White County. Farther to the northeast, the route passes Skitt Mountain Golf Course and Mossy Creek Campground. It then crosses over Dean, Mossy, White, and Flat Creeks before it intersects SR 384 just southeast of the unincorporated  community of Leaf. Just after SR 384, the highway meets its eastern terminus, an intersection with SR 115, which is east of Leaf.

No section of SR 254 is part of the National Highway System, a system of routes determined to be the most important for the nation's economy, mobility and defense.

History
SR 254 was established in 1949 along an alignment from US 129/SR 11 to its eastern terminus. In 1953, this entire section was paved. By 1963, the road was extended, and paved, along the rest of its current alignment, from Clermont to the intersection with US 129/SR 11.

Major intersections

See also

References

External links

254
Transportation in Hall County, Georgia
Transportation in White County, Georgia